Carlos Jacanamijoy (born 1964 in Santiago, Putumayo) is a Colombian painter of native South American origin of the Inga people. His artwork has been exhibited in more than 25 individual shows and is part of the permanent collection of the National Museum of the American Indian as well as several Colombian museums. He lives and works in Bogotá.

Education
Jacanamijoy started his higher education in fine arts at the Universidad de La Sabana in Bogotá between 1983 and 1984. The following year he moved to the southern Colombian city of Pasto to continue his studies in fine arts at the University of Nariño.

Between 1986 and 1990 Jacanamijoy received a Master in Plastic Arts from the National University of Colombia in Bogotá. In 1989 he also began studying philosophy and literature at La Salle University, graduating in 1990.

Artwork
"Carlos Jacanamijoy's vivid landscapes embody creation and the transformative Putumayo jungle of Colombia through abstractions of color and light," writes Navajo curator, Kathleen Ash-Milby of his work. His oil paintings are atmospheric, with soft edges and a juxtaposition of primarily cool blues and warm yellows. Although nonobjective abstraction dominates his work, Jacanamijoy has also painted figurative work, such as his portrait of the writer Gabriel García Marquez.

Exhibitions
 The George Gustav Heye Center, National Museum of the American Indian, Off the Map: Landscape in the Native Imagination, New York, 2007.
 Luis Ángel Arango Library, Bank of the Republic, Bogotá, Colombia.
 Museum of Modern Art of Bogotá, Colombia.
 La Tertulia Museum, Cali, Colombia.
 Museum of Modern Art, Pereira, Colombia.
 Museum of Art, National University of Colombia, Bogotá, Colombia.
 District Planetary, Bogotá, Colombia.

Quote
"I remember listening, among lights and shadows, to the cacophony of animals during an overwhelming night in the middle of the jungle. My inspiration is, on one side, my experiences in my studio, on the other, a succession of memories of the jungle in Putumayo. It is this constant trail of memory and dreams passing by in my mind when I am in front of that other window: the empty canvas."–Carlos Jacanmijoy, 2007

Notes

References
 Serrano, Eduardo. Jacanamijoy Villegas Editores (Bogota) (2003) .

External links
Images of his work on Artnet
Off the Map. Carlos Jacanamijoy exhibit at the National Museum of the American Indian (pdf)
 Carlos Jacanamijoy official website
 Bogotá Cinema festival - Carlos Jacanamijoy
 Biography
 Cromos, January 5, 2007 Jacanamijoy en la selva de concreto

20th-century Colombian painters
20th-century Colombian male artists
21st-century painters
1964 births
Living people
Latin American artists of indigenous descent
National University of Colombia alumni
People from Putumayo Department
21st-century indigenous painters of the Americas
University of La Sabana alumni
20th-century indigenous painters of the Americas
Colombian male painters